Saint-Sauveur-de-Flée is a former commune in the Maine-et-Loire department in western France. On 15 December 2016, it was merged into the new commune Segré-en-Anjou Bleu. Its population was 319 in 2019.

See also
Communes of the Maine-et-Loire department

References

Saintsauveurdeflee